Peter David Douglas Bradley (born 4 June 1949) was the Archdeacon of Warrington from 2001 until 31 October 2015.

Bradley was educated at Brookfield School, Kirkby and Lincoln Theological College;  and ordained in 1980. He was a Curate in Upholland and then served as the Vicar of Holy Spirit, Dovecot  before returning to Upholland in 1994. He was a member of the General Synod of the Church of England from 1990 to 2010.

References

 

1949 births
People from Kirkby
Alumni of Lincoln Theological College
Archdeacons of Warrington
Living people
Members of the General Synod of the Church of England